Portrait of Marsilio Cassotti and His Bride Faustina is a 1523 oil-on-panel painting by Lorenzo Lotto, now in the Prado Museum in Madrid. It is signed and dated "L. Lotus Pictor / 1523". It is the first known marriage portrait produced in Italy, inspired by prints from Germany and the Low Countries.

A note by the artist survives describing the subjects, their "habiti de seta, scufioti e collane" and the work's original price: 30 denari, later reduced to 20. It was commissioned by the groom's father and remained in their family until being taken to Spain, possibly in the 17th century. It was recorded in a catalogue of the artworks in the Alcázar in 1666 and passed to its present home in the 19th century.

It shows the couple at the moment of marriage, with the groom placing a ring on the bride's finger. Her red dress is similar to that in Portrait of Lucina Brembati. She also wears two necklaces, one of pearl (symbolising her attachment to her husband) and another of gold. Behind the couple is a cupid, placing a yoke on their shoulders to symbolise the marital bond and the virtues needed to maintain the new marriage bond.

References

Cassotti
Cassotti
1523 paintings
Paintings of the Museo del Prado by Italian artists